Lawrence is a census-designated place located in Cecil Township, Washington County in the state of Pennsylvania.  The community is a Pittsburgh suburb located in northern Washington County near the Allegheny County line.  As of the 2010 census the population was 540 residents.

Demographics

History
Lawrence was mostly built as a miner's village for the Montour #4 Mine, which opened in 1914. Montour #4 closed in 1980 after flooding.

Economy
Black Box Corporation is based in Lawrence.

References

Census-designated places in Washington County, Pennsylvania
Census-designated places in Pennsylvania